Bernard Stanley "Acker" Bilk,  (28 January 1929 – 2 November 2014) was an English clarinetist and vocalist known for his breathy, vibrato-rich, lower-register style, and distinctive appearance – of goatee, bowler hat and striped waistcoat.

Bilk's 1962 instrumental tune "Stranger on the Shore" became the UK's biggest selling single of 1962. It spent more than 50 weeks on the UK charts, peaking at number two, and was the second No. 1 single in the United States by a British artist.

Early life
Bilk was born in Pensford, Somerset, in 1929. He earned the nickname "Acker" from the Somerset slang for "friend" or "mate". His parents tried to teach him the piano but, as a boy, Bilk found it restricted his love of outdoor activities, including football. He lost two front teeth in a school fight and half a finger in a sledging accident, both of which he said affected his eventual clarinet style.

On leaving school Bilk joined the workforce of W.D. & H.O. Wills's cigarette factory in Bristol; he stayed there for three years, putting tobacco in the cooling room and then pushing tobacco through a blower. He then undertook three years of National Service with the Royal Engineers in the Suez Canal Zone. He learned the clarinet there after his sapper friend, John A. Britten, gave him one bought at a bazaar and for which Britten had no use. The clarinet had no reed, so Britten fashioned a makeshift one for the instrument from scrap wood. Bilk later borrowed a better instrument from the army and kept it after demobilisation. After National Service, Bilk joined his uncle's blacksmith business and qualified in the trade.

Career
Bilk played with friends on the Bristol jazz circuit and in 1951 moved to London to play with Ken Colyer's band. Bilk disliked London, so returned west and formed his own band in Pensford called the Chew Valley Jazzmen, which was renamed the Bristol Paramount Jazz Band when they moved to London in 1951. Their agent then booked them for a six-week gig in Düsseldorf, Germany, playing in a beer bar seven hours a night, seven nights a week. During this time, Bilk and the band developed their distinctive style and appearance, complete with striped waistcoats and bowler hats.

After returning from Germany, Bilk became based in Plaistow, London, and his band played in London jazz clubs. It was from here that Bilk became part of the boom in trad jazz in the United Kingdom in the late 1950s. In 1960, their single "Summer Set" (a pun on their home county), co-written by Bilk and pianist Dave Collett, reached number five on the UK Singles Chart, and began a run of 11 chart hit singles. ("Summer Set" was also used prominently in Daniel Farson's controversial 1960 television documentary Living for Kicks, a portrait of British teenage life at the time). In 1961 "Acker Bilk and His Paramount Jazz Band" appeared at the Royal Variety Performance.

Bilk was not an internationally known musician until 1962, when the experimental use of a string ensemble on one of his albums and the inclusion of a composition of his own as its keynote piece won him an audience outside the UK. He had composed a melody, entitled "Jenny" after his daughter, but was asked to change the title to "Stranger on the Shore" for use in a British television series of the same name. He went on to record it as the title track of a new album in which his deep and quavering clarinet was backed by the Leon Young String Chorale.

The single was not only a big hit in the United Kingdom, where it stayed on the charts for 55 weeks, helped by Bilk being the subject of the TV show This Is Your Life, but also topped the American charts. As a result, Bilk was the second British artist to have a single in the number-one position on the Billboard Hot 100 singles chart. (Vera Lynn was the first, with "Auf Wiederseh'n Sweetheart" in 1952.) "Stranger on the Shore" sold over one million copies, and was awarded a gold disc. At the height of his career, Bilk's public relations workers were known as the "Bilk Marketing Board", a pun on the Milk Marketing Board.

At the height of his international fame in 1962, he appeared in two theatrical motion pictures. It's Trad, Dad! (released in the United States by Columbia Pictures as Ring-a-Ding Rhythm) was a Richard Lester musical combining dixieland and rock-and-roll specialties; "Mr. Acker Bilk" and his band were the best represented, with three songs and a speaking role for Bilk. The second picture, Band of Thieves, was a comedy starring "Mr. Acker Bilk" and his group as musicians in prison. His music was also heard on the soundtracks to films such as Bitter Harvest (1963), West 11 (1963), and the musical comedy It's All Over Town (1964). He also played a cameo role in the latter film.

Bilk's success tapered off when British rock and roll made its big international impact beginning in 1964 and he shifted direction to the cabaret circuit. However, he did record a series of well-regarded albums in the mid-1960s. Three of them, including the 1965 collaboration Together, with the Danish jazz pianist and composer Bent Fabric ("The Alley Cat"), were also released successfully in the United States on the Atlantic Records subsidiary Atco. In 1968 the album Blue Acker, produced by Denis Preston and with arrangements by Stan Tracey, illustrated that Bilk remained highly regarded as a musician, even by those (like Tracey) on the "modern jazz" side of things. Duncan Heining rates it as "one of the highlights of British jazz of the period".

Bilk finally had another chart success in 1976 with "Aria", which went to number five in the United Kingdom. In May 1977 Bilk and his Paramount Jazz Band provided the interval act for the Eurovision Song Contest. His last chart appearance was in 1978, when the TV-promoted album released on Pye/Warwick, Evergreen, reached 17 in a 14-week album chart run. In the early 1980s, Bilk and his signature hit were newly familiar, due to "Stranger on the Shore" being used in the soundtrack to Sweet Dreams, the film biography of country music singer Patsy Cline. "Aria" featured as a central musical motif in the 2012 Polish film .

Bilk continued to tour with his Paramount Jazz Band, as well as performing concerts with his two contemporaries, Chris Barber and Kenny Ball, both of whom were born in 1930, as "The 3Bs". Bilk also provided vocals on many of his tracks, including on "I'm an Old Cowhand", "The Folks Who Live on the Hill", "White Cliffs of Dover", "Travellin On" and "That's My Home".

He was appointed MBE in 2001.

In 2005 he was awarded the BBC Jazz Awards' "Gold Award".

One of his recordings was with the Chris Barber band, sharing the clarinet spot with the band's regular reedsmen, John Crocker and Ian Wheeler. Bilk made a CD with Wally Fawkes for the Lake label in 2002. He appeared on three albums by Van Morrison: Down the Road; What's Wrong With This Picture?; and Born to Sing: No Plan B.

In 2012 Bilk said that, after 50 years, he was "fed up" with playing his most famous tune, "Stranger on the Shore".

Bilk died in Bath, Somerset, on 2 November 2014, at the age of 85. He was survived by his wife and two children.

Bilk's last recorded interview was for Cornish community station Penwith Radio (now Coast FM) and was broadcast on Sunday 16 November 2014 at 9:00 pm.

Personal life
Bilk married his childhood sweetheart, Jean Hawkins, whom he met in the same class at school in 1954. The couple had two children: Jenny and Pete. After living near London in Potters Bar for many years the couple retired to Pensford.

In 1997, Bilk was diagnosed with throat cancer, which was treated through surgery and then followed by daily radiation therapy at Bristol Haematology and Oncology Centre. Subsequently, he had eight keyhole operations for bladder cancer and suffered a minor stroke.

Other interests
Bilk was part of a consortium which took over the Oxford Cheetahs speedway team in 1972. They were rebranded as Oxford Rebels as part of the takeover.

Legacy
Bilk has been described as the "Great Master of the Clarinet". "Stranger on the Shore" – which he was once quoted as calling "my old-age pension" – remains a standard of jazz and popular music alike.

Discography

Albums

EPs

Singles

See also
West Country dialects
Django Reinhardt, another influential jazz musician with finger-damage who was still able to become a virtuoso on his instrument

References

External links
Official site
On being appointed an honorary Master of Arts at Bristol University

1929 births
2014 deaths
Military personnel from Somerset
Royal Engineers soldiers
20th-century British Army personnel
Musicians from Somerset
People from Bath and North East Somerset
British expatriates in Germany
20th-century British male musicians
20th-century clarinetists
20th-century British musicians
21st-century British male musicians
21st-century clarinetists
21st-century British musicians
Atco Records artists
British blacksmiths
Dixieland clarinetists
British jazz clarinetists
British jazz musicians
Members of the Order of the British Empire
Stomp Off artists
Pye Records artists
Columbia Records artists